Basilissopsis hakuhoae is a species of sea snail, a marine gastropod mollusc in the family Seguenziidae.

Description

Distribution

References

hakuhoae
Gastropods described in 2008